Áed Dub mac Suibni (died c. 588) was an Irish king of the Dál nAraidi in the over-kingdom of Ulaid (in modern Ulster). He may have been king of the Ulaid. Áed was succeeded by his great-nephew Fiachnae mac Báetáin.

Áed Dub — Black Áed — killed the last High King of Ireland to undergo the pre-Christian inauguration ritual, Diarmait mac Cerbaill. Tradition has Diarmaid die a mythic threefold death, and some version make Áed Diarmaid's foster-son. The Annals of Tigernach report, more prosaically, that Diarmaid was killed by Áed Dub in 565 at Ráith Bec, on the plain of Mag Line (Moylinny, near Larne), in the lands of the Dál nAraidi.

Adomnán's account

In Book I, Chapter 36 of Adomnán of Iona's Life of Saint Columba, it states that Áed Dub was later ordained as a priest, an ordination that Adomnán describes as a sham because of his history of violence. He writes that when Columba learned of this, he prophecised that although Áed would live for many years to come, he "will return as a dog to his vomit; he will again be a bloody murderer and in the end, killed by a spear, he will fall from wood into water and die drowning." This is again the mythic three-fold death, and probably signifies that there was some manner of traditional account of Áed Dub. Adomnan also states that Aed Dub was the lover of a priest called Finchan, the founder of a monastery in Tiree. The two men were strongly attached to one another "in a carnal way".

From Adomnán's account it can be surmised that Áed was deposed, or abdicated, and spent time in Britain in a monastery before, presumably, returning to Ulster to try to regain his throne. The report of Áed Dub's death in the Annals of Ulster for 588 — the Annals of Tigernach place it in 579 — may contain some traces of this as it reports the killing of Áed aboard a ship. This is thought to have taken place on Lough Neagh.

See also
Kings of Dál nAraidi
Kings of Ulster

References

Bibliography
 Adomnán of Iona, Life of Saint Columba, tr. & ed. Richard Sharpe. Penguin, London, 1995. 
 Byrne, Francis John, Irish Kings and High-Kings. Batsford, London, 1973. 

Kings of Ulster
Kings of Dál nAraidi
6th-century births
588 deaths
People from County Antrim
6th-century Irish monarchs